Calyptrocalyx is a monoecious genus of flowering plant in the palm family found in Papua New Guinea and the nearby Maluku Islands.  Ranging from small to large, the palms in this genus are increasingly found in cultivation owing largely to their purple, red, and orange colored, new foliage.  At least 26 species have been described while others, known only by local names, have not yet received a taxonomic account.  Palms formerly classified within Paralinospadix have been incorporated into this genus. It is named from 2 Greek words meaning 'covered' and 'calyx'.

Description 
Most Calyptrocalyx species are clustering while a few grow from solitary trunks, all being conspicuously ringed by leaf scars.  Trunk diameters range from 1 cm in C. arfakiensis to 25 cm in C. spicatus, spanning heights of 1 to 12 m.  The leaves may be pinnate, bifid, or undivided on adaxially channeled, abaxially rounded petioles.  While the foliage of these palms matures to various shades of green it is often brightly colored when emergent.

The inflorescence is usually an unbranched, interfoliar spike with unisexual flowers of both sexes; both pistillate and staminate flowers have three sepals and three petals. The fruit produced by Calyptrocalyx species is usually orange or red in color when mature, each containing one seed.

Distribution and habitat 
All of these palms are found in Papua New Guinea except C. spicatus which grows in the Moluccas. They are all undergrowth inhabitants of rain forests from sea level up to 1000 m, often on montane slopes and occasionally alongside streams and in swamps.

Cultivation 
Commonly cultivated for their colorful new leaves, these palms are not hardy to cold and require protection from freezing temperatures.  They prefer a quickly draining, humus-rich soil and shade or filtered light when young, though some will adapt to full sun as they mature.  They also require protection from cold, dry winds which easily damage or kill them.

References

External links 
 GBIF Portal
 Calyptrocalyx on NPGS/GRIN
 PACSOA - Calyptrocalyx
 Fairchild Guide to Palms: Calyptrocalyx
Calyptrocalyx Google image search

 
Arecaceae genera